Mark Frith (born 22 May 1970, in Sheffield) is a British journalist and editor. He has been a writer and editor for magazines such as Smash Hits, Time Out and Heat. He has since branched into TV and radio presenting and is an author of novels.

Background 
Mark Frith was born in Sheffield in 1970. He attended Gleadless Valley Secondary Comprehensive School in Norton, Sheffield, before going on to study at the University of East London, where he edited the college magazine Overdraft, but did not graduate. Frith joined the editorial team at Smash Hits and became editor at the age of 23. He then joined SKY Magazine as editor for two years before joining Heat magazine in 1999. He was put in charge in early 2000 and transformed the title from a 60,000-a-week selling magazine to sales of over half a million an issue. He left the magazine in May 2008. Following this he became editor for London listings magazine Time Out from 24 July 2009 until 8 July 2011, when he was succeeded as editor by Tim Arthur. In 2012 he became a contributor to 1980s-themed music magazine Classic Pop, for which he still writes. In 2017, Frith was appointed the 18th editor of TV and radio listings magazine Radio Times replacing Ben Preston. He left in 2020.

He has subsequently made a spin-off career as a broadcaster and media 'talking head' on the subjects of celebrity and pop music. On 28 February 2008, Frith resigned from Heat, having landed a book deal with Ebury Press.

Frith has won magazine publishing awards in Britain including PPA Editor Of The Year (twice) and, in 2005, the Mark Boxer Award for Outstanding Achievement to British Magazines at the BSME Awards. Frith presented the BBC's Liquid News for a year, then in 2008 made his debut in Who’s Who and now regularly features on radio as part of Radio 4's Front Row show and on The Apprentice: You're Fired! on BBC2.

His book The Celeb Diaries is being adapted by Danny Brocklehurst and Big Talk (Spaced, Shaun of the Dead) for a TV series based around a celebrity magazine office situation.

Bibliography

External links
 The Celeb Diaries website
 The Guardian Profile: Mark Frith
 University of East London | Famous Names

References

British male journalists
British magazine editors
1970 births
Living people
People from Norton Lees
Alumni of the University of East London
Writers from Sheffield